Amadi State was a state in South Sudan that existed between 2 October 2015 and 22 February 2020. Amadi state formed from Western Equatoria state on 2 October 2015, following a decree that established the state along with 27 other states. It was located in the Equatoria region. Amadi State bordered Eastern Lakes State, Jubek State, Maridi State, Terekeka State, Western Lakes State, Yei River State.

History
Before Sudan's 10 original states split into 28 separate states, Amadi was part of Western Equatoria state. On 2 October 2015, President Salva Kiir issued a decree establishing 28 states in place of the 10 constitutionally established states. The decree established the new states largely along ethnic lines. A number of opposition parties and civil society groups challenged the constitutionality of the decree. Kiir later resolved to take it to parliament for approval as a constitutional amendment. In November, the South Sudanese parliament empowered President Kiir to create new states.

Joseph Ngere Paciko was the first and the current Governor of the state.

Geography
Amadi State was located in the Equatoria region and it bordered Western Lakes to the northwest, Eastern Lakes to the northeast, Yei River to the south, Jubek to the southeast, Maridi to the west, and Terekeka to the east.

Administrative divisions
The state consisted of 3 counties. These three counties were Mundri West County, Mundri East County, and Mvolo County.

Cities and towns
The capital of the state of Amadi was the city of Mundri, South Sudan. Mundri is located in Mundri West County, with an estimated population of 20,000-30,000 in 2015. Other towns and villages in Amadi State include:

 Lui, South Sudan (also known as Nagero Lui)
 Kotobi 
 Jambo
 Diko
 Karika
 Kediba
 Bari
 Bangolo
 Wandi
 Lacha
 Lanyi
 Lakamadi
 Doso
 Gulu
 Lozoa
 Kalichere
 Madiba 

 Wiro.

References

Equatoria
States of South Sudan